Apologia Pro Vita Sua (Latin: A defence of one's own life) is John Henry Newman's defence of his religious opinions, published in 1864 in response to Charles Kingsley of the Church of England after Newman quit his position as the Anglican vicar of St. Mary's, Oxford.

Description
Friction during the years from 1833 to 1841 had led Newman and his allies in the Oxford Movement to publish a statement, the Tracts for the Times, to which Newman was a contributor. The tensions culminated in Newman's 1845 resignation as Anglican vicar of St. Mary's, Oxford and his departure from the Anglican church and conversion to Roman Catholicism.[1]

Newman's essay was written in response to attacks from Charles Kingsley of the broad church party, and Newman's rival in the controversy surrounding the Tractarian movement, who responded to Newman's conversion with attacks impeaching his truthfulness and honour. Apologia Pro Vita Sua was a spiritual autobiographical defence to Kingsley's attacks.

The book became a bestseller and remains in print today. A revised version, with many passages rewritten and some parts omitted, was published in 1865.

References

Further reading
 Colby, Robert A. (1953). "The Poetical Structure of Newman's 'Apologia Pro Vita Sua'," The Journal of Religion, Vol. 33, No. 1, pp. 47–57.
 Deen, Leonard W. (1962). "The Rhetoric of Newman's Apologia," ELH, Vol. 29, No. 2, pp. 224–238.
 Peterson, Linda H. (1985). "Newman's Apologia Pro Vita Sua and the Traditions of the English Spiritual Autobiography," PMLA, Vol. 100, No. 3, pp. 300–314.
 Ward, Wilfrid (1913). Introduction to Apologia Pro Vita Sua. London: Oxford University Press, pp. v–xxx.

External links
 Apologia Pro Vita Sua, at Internet Archive

 
 Literary Encyclopedia article
 Full text at Newman Reader site

1864 non-fiction books
Books about Christianity
Christian apologetics
Works by John Henry Newman